James Meechan Hill  (2 September 1899 – 22 December 1966) was a Scottish Labour Member of Parliament for Midlothian from 1959 to 1966.  His successor was Alexander Eadie.

Hill was born and educated in Bellshill, Lanarkshire, the son of coal miner James Hill and Janet Meechan Hill. Also a miner by profession, Hill was elected to the Musselburgh Town Council in 1945, and to the Midlothian County Council in 1946. He was elected as a Labour candidate in the 1959 and re-elected in 1964.

Hill suffered heart problems in his second term, however, being hospitalised repeatedly. He was unable to contest the 1966 general election. He died in Edinburgh Royal Infirmary in December 1966.

References

External links 
 

1899 births
1966 deaths
Scottish Labour MPs
Members of the Parliament of the United Kingdom for Scottish constituencies
National Union of Mineworkers-sponsored MPs
UK MPs 1959–1964
UK MPs 1964–1966